Los Cayuelos is a location near the eastern city of Niquero in Cuba. It is known as the landing site of Fidel Castro and his troops on December 2, 1956.

Geography of Granma Province